Erkenci Kuş (English title: Daydreamer) is a Turkish television series that aired on Star TV from June 26, 2018 to August 6, 2019. The series stars Demet Özdemir and Can Yaman.

Plot 
Sanem is a young woman who aspires to be a writer and live on the Galápagos Islands. Despite working at her father's grocery store, she is forced by her parents to choose between an arranged marriage with her neighbor Muzaffer and finding a suitable job. Sanem lands a job at Fikri Harika, one of Turkey's leading advertising agencies, where Leyla, her sister, is an executive assistant. The owner of the advertising agency, Azizi, has two sons, Emre and Can. Emre wants to take over the company, but his father believes Can is a better fit for the job and he is appointed manager. Can has what his father wants for the company, but he prefers to take photos in remote locations. Upon learning of his father's health problems, Can eventually agrees to run the company. Aziz also tells Can to find the spy in the company who is helping their rival, Aylin. Emre doesn't like the idea of his brother being the manager, and believes that he should have the position. Emre's plan is to make him fail, as well as becoming the spy himself. Sanem bumps into Can on a dark balcony at an opera party celebrating the company's 40th anniversary. Can thinks she is his girlfriend Polen, so he kisses her. Sanem realizes that she loves the stranger who kissed her, and gives him the codename Albatross, but hates Can, and Emre makes her believe that Can only wants to increase the value of the company so that it can be sold. Can soon falls in love with Sanem, and finds out that he kissed her that day at the opera, which begins the inevitable story of love.

Cast 
 Demet Özdemir as Sanem Aydın: Intern and scriptwriter at Fikri Harika. She is Nihat and Mevkibe Aydın's daughter, Leyla's younger sister.
 Can Yaman as Can Divit: General manager, director and head of Fikri Harika agency, Emre's elder brother, Aziz and Hüma's son
 Özlem Tokaslan as Mevkibe Aydın: Sanem and Leyla's mother, Nihat Aydın's wife
 Cihan Ercan as Muzaffer "Zebercet" Kaya: Fellow resident of the Aydın's community
 Öznur Serçeler as Leyla Aydın: Finance assistant at the Fikri Harika agency. Nihat and Mevkibe Aydın's daughter, Sanem's elder sister.
 Berat Yenilmez as Nihat Aydın: Mevkibe Aydın's husband, Sanem and Leyla's father
 Birand Tunca as Emre Divit: Finance Manager of Fikri Harika agency, Can's younger brother, Aziz and Hüma's son.
 Sevcan Yaşar as Aylin Yükselen: Ex-fiancé of Emre Divit
 Anıl Çelik as Cengiz "Ceycey" Özdemir: Employee at Fikri Harika, Sanem's best friend
 Tuğçe Kumral as Deren Keskin: Creative Director of Fikri Harika 
 Ceren Taşçı as Ayhan Işık: Sanem's best friend, younger sister of Osman Işık, fellow resident of the Aydın's community
 Sibel Şişman as Güliz Yıldırım: Ex-Assistant of Aziz Divit, employee at Fikri Harika
 Tuana Tunalı as Metin Avukat: One of Can's best friends, lawyer of Fikri Harika
 Ali Yağcı as Osman Işık: Elder brother of Ayhan Işık, fellow resident of the Aydın's community
 Tolga Bayraklı as Akif: One of Can's best friends, owner of a printing company
 Asuman Çakır as Aysun Kaya: Fellow resident of Aydın's community, Muzaffer Kaya's mother
 Oğuz Okul as Rıfat
 Feri Baycu Güler as Melahat: Fellow residents of Aydın's community, owner of a salon
 Ahmet Somers as Aziz Divit: Can and Emre's father, ex-head and general director/manager of Fikri Harika 
 Kimya Gökçe Aytaç as Polen: Can's ex-girlfriend, physicist in Europe
 Ayşe Akın as Arzu Taş: Model
 Baki Çiftçi as Levent Divit
 Aslı Melisa Uzun as Gamze: Employee at Compass Sports, Can's university friend
 İpek Tenolcay as Hüma Divit Erdamar: Can's and Emre's mother, Aziz Divit's ex-wife
 Dilek Serbest as Ayça
 Utku Ateş as Yiğit: Polen's brother, head of a writing and publishing company
 Tufan Günaçan as Samet Hoca
 Gamze Topuz as Ceyda: CEO of Compass Sports
 Özgür Özberk as Enzo Fabri: Head of a perfume manufacturing company

References

External links 
 

2018 Turkish television series debuts
2019 Turkish television series endings
Turkish romantic comedy television series
Turkish television soap operas
Turkish-language television shows
Star TV (Turkey) original programming
Television shows set in Istanbul
Television series produced in Istanbul
Turkish television series endings